This list of national shooting records surpassing the world records is possible because of the International Shooting Sport Federation's rigid record regulations. Only competitions directly supervised by the ISSF – Olympic Games, World Championships, World Cups, World Cup Finals and continental championships – are approved for setting world records. On the other hand, most member federations have more relaxed rules for their national records. This creates many more opportunities for record-breaking, especially so in the non-Olympic events, where World Cups are not held.

Certain ISSF shooting events  (men's 300 metre rifle prone, trap (qualification) and skeet and women's trap (qualification)), are not listed below because the world record is unbeatable with a perfect score.



Rifle events

Pistol events

Shotgun events

Running target events

References 

Shooting records
Sport shooting-related lists